The Chaffee-Hunter House is a historic building located in Des Moines, Iowa, United States.  Built in 1886, the single family dwelling is named for its first two residents, Henry L. Chaffee and Edward H. Hunter who bought it from Chaffee in 1891.  The house calls attention to Hunter who served as the local postmaster from 1894 to 1898.  He conceived and implemented the idea of a streetcar-mounted collection box for the mail.  It was later implemented in other cities in the country.  The 2½-story frame Queen Anne structure features a gable-on-hip roof with intersecting gables, a brick foundation, wrap-around porch, and dormer windows.  The house was individually listed on the National Register of Historic Places in 1998.  It was included as a contributing property in the Polk County Homestead and Trust Company Addition Historic District in 2016.

References 

Houses completed in 1886
Queen Anne architecture in Iowa
Houses in Des Moines, Iowa
National Register of Historic Places in Des Moines, Iowa
Houses on the National Register of Historic Places in Iowa
Individually listed contributing properties to historic districts on the National Register in Iowa